Volodymyr Senytsya (born 26 April 1997 in Kalush, Ivano-Frankivsk Oblast, Ukraine) is a professional Ukrainian footballer, who plays as a centre-back.

Career
Senytsya is the product of the Kalush and UFK Lviv School Systems. He made his debut for FC Karpaty playing full-time in a match against FC Mariupol on 18 November 2017 in the Ukrainian Premier League.

He also played for the Ukrainian under-18 national football team and was called up for other age level representations.

References

External links
Statistics at FFU website (Ukr)

1997 births
Living people
Ukrainian footballers
Ukrainian expatriate footballers
FC Karpaty Lviv players
FC Kalush players
FC Inhulets Petrove players
FC Epitsentr Dunaivtsi players
FC Krystal Kherson players
Ukrainian Premier League players
Expatriate footballers in Poland
Ukrainian expatriate sportspeople in Poland

Association football defenders